Biostatistics is a peer-reviewed scientific journal covering biostatistics, that is, statistics for biological and medical research.

The journals that had cited Biostatistics the most by 2008 were Biometrics, Journal of the American Statistical Association, Biometrika, Statistics in Medicine, and Journal of the Royal Statistical Society, Series B.

Scott Zeger and Peter Diggle were the founding editors of Biostatistics.

References

External links

 IMPACT FACTOR AND RANKING

Biostatistics journals
Statistics journals
Publications established in 2000
Oxford University Press academic journals